Plenty is the third album from Red Box, and was released on 11 October 2010.

The Plenty Sessions 
The album was also released as a "Limited Edition" which included an exclusive six track bonus CD. Subsequently, these tracks were made available as digital downloads under the name The Plenty Sessions.

Sales performance 
Plenty was Cherry Red Records' best selling album for the months October to December 2010.

Audio previews 
Four tracks from the album can be previewed in their entirety on the SoundCloud: Red Box - Plenty samples page.

Track listing

Cherry Red Records CD: CDBRED470

Cherry Red Records Bonus CD: CDXRED471 - "The Plenty Sessions"

Personnel

Musicians 
"Stay"
 Simon Toulson-Clarke - Lead vocal and acoustic guitar
 Derek Adams - Acoustic guitar
 Steve Carr - Harmony vocal and harmonica
 Simon Cole - Piano
 Munch - Organ
 Alastair Gavin - String arrangement

"Hurricane"
 Simon Toulson-Clarke - Lead vocal and acoustic guitar
 Derek Adams - Electric guitar and drums
 Paul Bond - Electric guitar
 Ty Unwin - Keyboards
 Lloyd Green - Bass guitar

"Without"
 Simon Toulson-Clarke - Lead vocal, acoustic and electric guitars
 Steve Carr - Harmony vocal and bass guitar
 Derek Adams - Drums and electric guitar
 Emily Maguire - Backwards viola and cello
 Simon Cole - Organ
 Alastair Gavin - Additional organ

"Plenty"
 Simon Toulson-Clarke - Lead vocal and acoustic guitar
 Steve Carr - Harmony vocal, bass guitar and melodica
 Alastair Gavin - Organ
 Simon Cole - Drums
 Derek Adams - Backing vocal and percussion
 Paul Bond - Backing vocal

"The Sign"
 Simon Toulson-Clarke - Lead vocal, acoustic, electric and bass guitars
 Derek Adams - Acoustic guitar, drums and backing vocal
 Paul Bond - Electric guitar and backing vocal
 Ty Unwin - Keyboards and strings
 Emily Maguire, Lorna Gallagher and Julia Hobsbawn - Box Vox
 Simon Toulson-Clarke and Alastair Gavin - String arrangement

"Brighter Blue"
 Simon Toulson-Clarke - Lead vocal and acoustic guitar
 Derek Adams - Mandolin, drums and percussion
 Emily Maguire - Viola and harmony vocal
 Jonathan Isley - Acoustic guitar
 Frey Smith - Double bass
 Steve Carr - Harmony vocal

"I've Been Thinking of You"
 Simon Toulson-Clarke - Lead vocal, acoustic and bass guitars
 Steve Carr - Harmony vocal, acoustic guitar and harmonica
 Simon Cole - Piano
 Derek Adams - Drums
 Emily Maguire - Cello

"Don't Let Go"
 Simon Toulson-Clarke - Lead vocal, acoustic and electric guitars
 Steve Carr - Harmony vocal and bass guitar
 Derek Adams - Drums
 Simon Cole - Piano
 Paul Bond - Electric guitar
 Ty Unwin - Keyboards
 Alastair Gavin - Additional string arrangement

"Say What's in Your Head"
 Simon Toulson-Clarke - Lead vocal, acoustic guitar and orchestration
 Derek Adams - Banjo, electric piano and drums
 Paul Bond - Bass
 Sid Ek - Percussion

"It's True"
 Simon Toulson-Clarke - Lead vocal and acoustic guitar
 Derek Adams - Electric piano and percussion
 Steve Carr - Harmony vocal and electric guitar
 John Prestage - Trumpet

"Sacred Wall"
 Simon Toulson-Clarke - Lead vocal
 Derek Adams - Electric guitar
 Simon Cole - Piano
 Emily Maguire - Viola
 Steve Carr - Harmonica
 Alastair Gavin - String arrangement

"Let It Rain"
 Simon Toulson-Clarke - Lead vocal, acoustic and electric guitars
 Derek Adams - Electric guitar and drums
 Paul Bond - Bass and electric guitar
 Ty Unwin - Keyboards
 John Prestage - Trumpet
 Mick Hutchins - additional electric guitar

"Green"
 Simon Toulson-Clarke - Lead vocal and acoustic guitar
 Steve Carr - Harmony vocal and bass guitar
 Simon Cole - Piano
 Jonathan Isley - Acoustic guitar and drums
 Emily Maguire - Viola and cello
 Derek Adams - Percussion

"Never Let It Be Said"
 Simon Toulson-Clarke - Lead vocal, acoustic guitar and strings
 Derek Adams - Bass, banjo and strings
 Ty Unwin - Piano and strings
 Paul Bond - Electric guitar
 Buffy Sainte-Marie - Vocal sample

"Once I Dreamed"
 Simon Toulson-Clarke - Lead vocal and acoustic guitar
 Steve Carr - Harmony vocal and bass guitar
 Derek Adams - Acoustic guitar and drums
 Simon Cole - Piano
 Emily Maguire - Viola and cello

"Take My Hand for a While"
 Simon Toulson-Clarke - Lead vocal and acoustic guitar
 Steve Carr - Harmony vocal
 Sid Ek - Piano
 Frey Smith - Acoustic bass
 Alastair Gavin - String arrangement

Production 
 Simon Toulson-Clarke - Producer
 Matt Butler and Simon Toulson-Clarke - Mixing 
 Simon Toulson-Clarke and Matt Butler - Engineering
 Phill Brown and Will Bartle - Additional engineering
 Dick Beetham - Mastering
 Alastair Gavin - String arrangement and conductor
 Alexander Balanesco - Orchestra leader
 Recorded at Olive Road, Yellow Shark and Chapel Studios
 Mixed at Yellow Shark
 Mastered at 360 Mastering

References

External links

Audio previews from Plenty
 3. "Without"
 5. "The Sign"
 6. "Brighter Blue"
 14. "Never Let It Be Said"

Music video from Plenty

Music video from The Plenty Sessions
 

2010 albums
Red Box (band) albums